Arron or Aaron Crawford may refer to:

Arron Crawford (born 1983), Western Australian cricketer
Aaron Crawford (Canadian football) (born 1986), CFL long snapper
Aaron Crawford (American football) (born 1997), NFL defensive tackle
Aaron Jamal Crawford (born 1980), American basketball player
Aaron Crawford, American drummer with post-hardcore band Flee the Seen from 2003 to 2009